Crow's Nest is a mountain along the west bank of the Hudson River in the Town of Highlands on the northern edge of the United States Military Academy (USMA) at West Point. US 9W passes just west of its summit and offers panoramic views of the Hudson River, the military academy's ski slope, and Constitution Island.

A small portion of the northern slopes are within Storm King State Park, but most of the mountain is on USMA property and thus generally off limits to the public (it is fenced off along Route 9W). There is a television relay tower located near the summit.

Gallery

Notes 

Hudson Highlands
U.S. Route 9W
United States Military Academy
Mountains of Orange County, New York
Mountains of New York (state)